Purpuricenus sanguinolentus is a species of Longhorn beetle native to Sri Lanka and India and possibly in China. 

The host plants are Acacia arabica, Bambusa sp. and Dendrocalamus strictus.

References 

Cerambycinae
Insects of Sri Lanka
Insects of India
Insects described in 1795